Sarah L. Gorden (born September 13, 1992) is an American soccer player who plays as a defender for Angel City FC in the NWSL.

Early life 
The daughter of Jeff and Sue Gorden, Sarah Gorden began playing soccer at age four. When she began playing competitively, her speed on the pitch inspired her to join her high school track team. While attending James B. Conant High School she played as a defender for the Eclipse Select Soccer Club.

DePaul Blue Demons 
Gorden attended DePaul university from 2011 to 2015, following in the footsteps of her parents who were both student athletes at DePaul. Gorden majored in journalism and competed as a hurdler on the track team for her first two years of university in addition to playing soccer.

She scored her first collegiate goal on September 11, 2011, against Minnesota.

Gorden did not compete in the 2013 season due to pregnancy. She returned to the Blue Demons in 2014 to lead the team's defense to a conference title and an NCAA tournament appearance while allowing the fewest goals in the Big East Conference. In 2014, Gorden was named to the All-Big East second team. In 2015, Gorden was named Big East Defensive Player of the Week four times, and was named to the All-Big East first team.

Club career

Chicago Red Stars, 2016–2021
Gorden was drafted by Chicago Red Stars in the 3rd round of the 2016 NWSL College Draft. She made her professional debut in the season opener against the Houston Dash, subbing in for Alyssa Mautz in the 83rd minute of play.

In January 2021, Gorden was signed to a two-year contract renewal with Chicago Red Stars.

On October 29, 2021, Gorden became Chicago's first Iron Woman by playing every minute of the 2021 NWSL season.

Angel City FC, 2021–
On December 3, 2021, Gorden's rights were traded to Angel City FC ahead of the upcoming expansion draft.

International career
Gorden received her first call-up to the United States women's national soccer team in December 2019. In October 2020, Gorden was again called up to the United States national team.

Personal life
She gave birth to a son, Caiden, in 2014.

In September 2020, Gorden launched a nonprofit organization, HoodSpace.

In April 2021, Gorden and her boyfriend alleged that they were racially profiled by a security guard at BBVA Stadium.

References

External links

Red Stars Bio
DePaul Bio

1992 births
Living people
American women's soccer players
DePaul Blue Demons women's soccer players
National Women's Soccer League players
Chicago Red Stars draft picks
Chicago Red Stars players
Angel City FC players
People from Elk Grove Village, Illinois
Soccer players from Illinois
Sportspeople from Cook County, Illinois
Sportspeople from DuPage County, Illinois
Women's association football defenders
James B. Conant High School alumni
African-American women's soccer players
21st-century African-American sportspeople
21st-century African-American women